Fairfield is a suburb in Melbourne, Victoria, Australia,  north-east of Melbourne's Central Business District, located within the Cities of Darebin and Yarra local government areas. Fairfield recorded a population of 6,535 at the 2021 census.

Fairfield is bounded by Grange Road to the east, the Yarra River to the south, Darebin Road to the north and Northcote to the west.

History

Fairfield gets its name from "Fairfield Park", an estate that was subdivided from large tracts of land that was brought by Charles Henry James, a land speculator. The name was alleged to have come from Derbyshire, England.

Fairfield Post Office opened on 21 February 1887. It has since relocated. 

In 1962, Fairfield was part of the former City of Heidelberg. In that year, the suburb, along with Alphington, became part of the City of Northcote, which in 1994, became part of the City of Darebin.

Commerce and culture

Fairfield is predominantly residential, with a small north-eastern pocket remaining a light industrial area.

A three-storey hotel, the Grandview Hotel, was completed in 1888, with its licence was granted by the Licensing Court on 15 August in that year. It has been known for hosting live music, and in the 1970s the Aboriginal country music band, the Country Outcasts, featuring Harry & Wilga Williams, had a residency there.

The Station Street shopping district currently has 89 businesses operating within it, with 23 cafes/bars/restaurants and 17 food and wine specialists.

Fairfield has significant Greek and Italian communities, with 10.9% and 10.5% of residents being of those ancestries respectively. There are also strong numbers of Chinese, Dutch, German and Indian residents in the suburb.

Education
 Fairfield Primary School
 St Anthony's Primary School
 Melbourne Polytechnic has a campus on the site of the former Fairfield Infectious Diseases Hospital, specialising in visual arts, music, horticulture, and jewellery manufacture.

Sporting clubs
 Fairfield Bowling Club plays lawn bowls at Gillies St.
 Fairfield Cricket Club
 Soccer teams Fitzroy City and Yarra Jets play home matches at Fairfield Park.
 Golfers play at the course of the Yarra Bend Golf Club on Yarra Bend Road.
 Fairfield is home to the Darebin International Sports Centre, which played host to events during the 2006 Commonwealth Games.

Transport

Bus
Six bus routes service Fairfield:

 : Melbourne CBD (Queen Street) – La Trobe University (Bundoora Campus). Operated by Kinetic Melbourne.
 : Alphington station – Moonee Ponds Junction via Northcote and Brunswick. Operated by Dysons.
 : Essendon station – Ivanhoe station via Brunswick West, Moreland station, Thornbury and Fairfield. Operated by Moreland Buslines.
 : Heidelberg station – Queen Victoria Market via Clifton Hill, Carlton and the University of Melbourne. Operated by Dysons.
 : Northcote – Regent station via Northland Shopping Centre. Operated by Dysons.
 : Hawthorn station – Fairfield via Kew. Operated by Dysons.

Train
Fairfield is serviced by Fairfield station, which is on the Hurstbridge line.

Gallery

See also
 City of Northcote – Fairfield was previously within this former local government area.

References

External links

Suburbs of Melbourne
Suburbs of the City of Yarra
Suburbs of the City of Darebin